The Bulgarian Supercup is the trophy won in a football match held between the football club that has won the Bulgarian first football division in the season that ended in the year of the match and the holder of the Bulgarian Cup at that time. In case the champion of Bulgaria has also won the cup, the Bulgarian Cup finalist competes with the champion in the match for the trophy.

The Supercup match is usually held during the weekend before the start of a new season. Since 2004 the Supercup game has been an annual event.  The most successful club in the event is Ludogorets Razgrad with six Supercup titles and four times being runners-up. Ludogorets is the club that has participated in most seasons of the Supercup with ten appearances. The competition has been dominated by Sofia-based teams. The Sofia teams have won together a total number of 7 titles.

History

Inaugural Event 1989

The first match for the Bulgarian Supercup was held in 1989. The match was proposed by Kiril Zaharinov, sports editor at the Bulgarian News Agency and secretary of the union of the Bulgarian sport journalists at that time.

The match was held at 9th September Stadium in Burgas, opposing 1988-89 Bulgarian champion and Cup holder CFKA Sredets (now CSKA Sofia) and the runner-up in the 1988–89 edition of the Bulgarian Cup Chernomorets Burgas. CSKA won the match 1-0 thanks to a goal by Hristo Stoichkov.

The first Supercup trophy was made in Italy and was 80 cm tall, weighing 15 kg. Today it is kept in the CSKA Sofia museum.

Since 2004

After the political changes of 1989 in Eastern Europe the Bulgarian Supercup match was suspended. Fourteen years later the Bulgarian Professional Football League in association with the Bulgarian Football Union decided to restore the event organising a Supercup match between the champion of the 2003-04 season, PFC Lokomotiv Plovdiv and the 2003–04 Bulgarian Cup holder, PFC Litex Lovech. The match was held at Naftex Stadium in Burgas and Lokomotiv won 1-0 after a last-minute goal by Ivan Paskov.

Since the restoration of the tournament in 2004 ten teams have participated in the event and eight of them have managed to win the trophy - PFC Litex Lovech (winners in 2010), PFC Beroe Stara Zagora (winners in 2013), PFC Cherno More Varna (winners in 2015), PFC Botev Plovdiv (winners in 2017), Lokomotiv Plovdiv (winners in 2004 and 2020), PFC Levski Sofia (winners in 2005, 2007 and 2009), PFC CSKA Sofia (winners in
2006, 2008 and 2011) and PFC Ludogorets Razgrad (winners in 2012, 2014, 2018, 2019, 2021).

In 2021 the winner of the cup Ludogorets Razgrad became the single most successful team in the event, winning their fifth trophy as they beat CSKA Sofia with final score 4-0. Also, as of 2021 Ludogorets Razgrad has participated nine times in the Supercup match - most of all other participants.

From 2004 onwards a brand new trophy is made for every event as it was decided by the organisers that each Supercup winner should retain the trophy in perpetuity. However, three designs have been used for the trophy as of 2004 - one for the Supercups of 2004–2006, another for the trophies of 2007-2010 and the third from 2011 onwards. The current trophy was designed in Italy in 2007 and is 100 cm tall.

Supercup finals

§ Note: The 2016 Bulgarian Supercup was meant to be the 14th Bulgarian Supercup, an annual Bulgarian football match played between the winners of the previous season's A PFG and Bulgarian Cup. The game was to be played between CSKA Sofia, winners of the 2016 Bulgarian Cup, and Ludogorets Razgrad, champions of the 2015–16 A PFG. However, prior to the match CSKA Sofia went into bankruptcy, followed by taking another team's professional license.  As a consequence, the 2016 Bulgarian Supercup final was not held.

Performance

Performance by club

Performance by city

External links
Bulgaria Cups Overview - Super Cup, RSSSF.com

 
Bulgaria
S